Lullius is a genus of lace bugs in the family Tingidae. There are about eight described species in Lullius.

Species
These eight species belong to the genus Lullius:
 Lullius affinis Duarte Rodrigues, 1989
 Lullius biseriatus Duarte Rodrigues, 1985
 Lullius insolens Drake, 1944
 Lullius major Distant, 1904
 Lullius minor Distant, 1904
 Lullius parvus Duarte Rodrigues, 1990
 Lullius spinifemur Drake, 1961
 Lullius turneri Duarte Rodrigues, 1982

References

Further reading

 
 
 
 
 
 
 
 
 
 
 

Tingidae
Articles created by Qbugbot